Tamaz may refer to:

Tamaz Chiladze (born 1931), Georgian writer, dramatist and poet
Tamaz Gelashvili (born 1978), Georgian chess grandmaster
Tamaz Kostava (born 1956), retired Georgian Soviet football player
Tamaz Meliava (1929–1972), Georgian Soviet film director and screenwriter
Tamaz Nadareishvili (1954–2004), Georgian politician, head of the Council of Ministers of Abkhazia
Tamaz Pertia (born 1974), former Georgian football midfielder, currently a manager with Skonto Riga
Tamaz Stephania Stadium, multi-use stadium in Bolnisi, Georgia
Tamaz V. Gamkrelidze (born 1929), Georgian linguist, orientalist, public benefactor, Hittitologist, Academician
Tamaz Vashakidze (born 1961), ballet artist, premier dancer of the State Georgian Ballet, choreographer

See also
 
Tahmasp (disambiguation)
Tamaas
Tamasa
Tamazh
Tameza
Tamiza
Tammuz (disambiguation)
Tammouz (disambiguation)
Thomaz
Tomasz (disambiguation)

Georgian masculine given names